WFHW-LP was a low-powered community-oriented television station licensed to Buffalo, New York, founded by consumer rights advocate Ralph Nader in summer 1989 as W58AV on UHF 58.  The station broadcast from the top of the Marine Midland Bank Tower (now Seneca One Tower) in downtown Buffalo, with an initial power of 100 watts (later upgraded to 1000, and finally, 15,100 watts). From the beginning, the station aired a large amount of locally produced fare, with programming from Channel America, as well as a partnership with The Learning Channel.  By 1991, the station had partnered up with Medaille College, though this would only last until January 1, 1993.

At some point in the mid-1990s, the station upgraded from translator to low-powered television status, and changed its call letters to WFHW-LP after what would become its last operator, the local branch of the non-profit Friendship House.  The station ceased operations on Halloween in 1999 after the Friendship House ceased operations, several years before the Digital television transition in the United States. Channel 58 would not be reissued; it would later be allocated to WJET-TV/Erie, Pennsylvania as a temporary digital channel prior to the transition, after which it (along with all stations between 52 and 69) would be removed from the television spectrum.

References

External links

Defunct television stations in the United States
FHW-LP
Television channels and stations established in 1989
Television channels and stations disestablished in 1999
1989 establishments in New York (state)
1999 disestablishments in New York (state)
Ralph Nader
FHW-LP